Amadu Wurie (August 27 1898 – 13 June 1977) was an early Sierra Leonean educationist and politician.

Biography
Wurie was born in Gbinti, Port Loko District, in the Northern Province of British Sierra Leone, the son of a Fula paramount chief. He was educated at the Bo School in Bo, one of the first set of pupils (Admission Number 55) when the school opened in 1906.

In 1916, he was in the first class of Sierra Leoneans that passed the British civil service exam and was appointed the assistant headmaster of the Bo School that year. By 1935, Wurie rose to the position of Senior assistant headmaster which allowed him to be the first African to serve even temporarily as the Headmaster. From 1935 to 1955, Wurie served in various locations across the colony, primarily as headmaster and inspector of schools.

Upon national independence in 1961, Wurie was elected as an MP under the banner of the Sierra Leone People's Party (SLPP), a party he helped found. He was first appointed Minister of Education and later Minister of Interior, a position he kept until he lost his seat in 1967. He then retired to Mahera in the Port Loko District and later made a Hajj to Mecca. In 1973, Wurie was honoured with an honorary doctorate degree from University of Sierra Leone. Wurie died in June 1977 at the age of 79.

External links
"Sierra Leonean heroes Fifty Great Men and Women Who Helped to Build Our Nation"

Sierra Leonean educators
Sierra Leone People's Party politicians
1898 births
1977 deaths
Education ministers
Interior ministers
Government ministers of Sierra Leone
Sierra Leonean Fula people
People from Port Loko District